Timolaus of Cyzicus was one of Plato's students.   

Cyzicus is an ancient city of Mysia, located in the northwest of Asia Minor.

References
Diogenes Laërtius, Life of Plato. Translated by C.D. Yonge.

Academic philosophers
4th-century BC philosophers
Students of Plato